The League of Polish Families (Polish: Liga Polskich Rodzin, LPR) is a conservative political party in Poland, with many far-right elements in the past. The party's original ideology was that of the National Democracy movement which was headed by Roman Dmowski, however in 2006 its leader Roman Giertych distanced himself from that heritage.

It was represented in the Polish parliament, forming part of the cabinet of Jarosław Kaczyński until the latter dissolved in September 2007. In the 2007 parliamentary election, it failed to gain the 5% threshold required to enter the Sejm and lost all its seats, even failing to cross the 3% threshold for eligibility to receive government funding. Since then, the party has become a minor political force, but continues to exist.

The All-Polish Youth used to be affiliated with the party as its youth wing, but these two organisations later severed their relations.

History 
The LPR was created just before the elections in 2001 and gained 8% of the vote, giving it 38 out of 460 seats in the Sejm and 2 seats in the Senate. Its former leader, Roman Giertych, studied Law and History at Adam Mickiewicz University in Poznań. During his career his political alliances have included such Polish National Democrats as Jan Łopuszański, Antoni Macierewicz, Gabriel Janowski.

Roman Giertych reactivated the "All-Polish Youth" (Młodzież Wszechpolska) organization in 1989, becoming its chairman; he remains honorary chairman. For several years he was a member of the National-Democratic Party (Stronnictwo Narodowo-Demokratyczne) and the National Party (Stronnictwo Narodowe), which merged with several other organizations to form the League of Polish Families (Liga Polskich Rodzin, LPR) in 2001.

Roman Giertych's father, Maciej Giertych, also a member of LPR, is a former member of the European Parliament. His grandfather was a member of parliament of the Second Polish Republic prior to World War II from the National Democracy Party. Some sources claim that the LPR owes much of its success to Radio Maryja, a Catholic radio station with a nationalist, ultra-conservative agenda.

The performance of League of Polish Families in the September 2001 elections, has been partly attributed to its well publicized and uncompromising attitude towards Jedwabne pogrom.  During the election campaign Ryszard Bender, one of the LPR founders and leaders, participated in LPR television broadcasts denying the facts of the Jedwabne pogrom of 1941 and accusing President Aleksander Kwaśniewski, who participated in commemoration ceremony, that took place in the village of Jedwabne in July 2001, of bowing to Jewish interest groups.

Soon after the election in 2001 a group of deputies separated from LPR, creating a new party known now as Polish Agreement led by Jan Łopuszański and Catholic-National Movement (Ruch Katolicko-Narodowy) led by Antoni Macierewicz.

In the 2004 elections to the European Parliament LPR received 15,2% votes, which gave it 10 out of 54 seats reserved for Poland in the European Parliament. This made the LPR the second largest party in Poland in that election, second only to the liberal conservative Civic Platform (PO), and well ahead of the then ruling post-communist Democratic Left Alliance, the populist Samoobrona and the conservative Law and Justice (PiS). However, overall turnout  of that election was less than 20% of eligible voters. Thus, the long-term significance of the LPR's strong performance in that election is unclear. In the 2005 elections LPR again received 8% of votes, but saw its seats reduced from 38 to 34. However, it gained five seats in the Senate, taking it up to 7.

In the 2007 Parliamentary election it failed to gain the 5% of votes required to enter the Sejm and lost all its seats, in addition to failing meeting the 3% of votes requirement for eligibility to receive government funding. The leader of the party, Roman Giertych, has stepped down from his post as the party's leader, but remains a member.

Some present or former members of LPR (including Janusz Dobrosz) and five of its MEPs moved to Forward Poland in 2008/9.

In the 2010s, the party became more moderate and changed its attitude towards the European Union. In parliamentary and presidential elections it usually supports the candidates of the Civic Platform or the Polish People's Party. In 2019, LPR declared its accession to the European Coalition. Roman Giertych is an active supporter of polish opposition and Committee for the Defence of Democracy. He also cooperates with Civic Platform and Poland 2050. 

There is a significant group of former party's politicians (e.g. Krzysztof Bosak), who are members of National Movement, which is a part of Confederation. All-Polish Youth is also part ot this coalition.

Ideology 

The party was described as belonging to the populist current in European politics, that juxtaposes the 'simple man' and the 'corrupt elite'.

The Journal of Communist Studies and Transition Politics described the party as clerical-nationalist, the party's agenda combining conservative social values, Christian solidarism and nationalism. Adam Michnik has characterized the groups that formed the party as the heirs of the chauvinist, xenophobic and anti-Semitic organizations of the pre-war Poland.

Some of the policies the LPR opposes include: the selling of land to foreigners (especially German expellees), abolishing the draft, legalization of "soft drugs", legalization of abortion, euthanasia, and gay marriage. It supports capital punishment, maintaining universal health care and public education, and supports the withdrawal of Polish troops from Iraq. The LPR also supports the publication of the complete archives of the Polish communist secret police—in other words, full "de-Communization".

The party particularly appealed to voters sympathetic towards traditional social values, the Catholic faith, and the concept of Polish national sovereignty. Its policies also attract some who feel lost in the post-1989 political transformation of the country, although the populist Andrzej Lepper's Samoobrona ("Self Defense"), also speaking out for the 'simple man', menaced by the post 1989 changes thus appeal more directly to so-called marginalized voters. The press close to the party has published anti-semitic articles; some of the Polish politicians like Adam Michnik have been characterized as pink hyenas representing non-Polish interests, assisted by Mossad and “godless, satanical masons propagating nihilism and demoralisation.” Those “dark forces” are said to be fiercely opposed to a Catholic state of the Polish nation.

The party was considered staunchly homophobic, and its opposition to same-sex marriage and several other demands of Polish gays and lesbians has led to condemnation of the party by the European Commission. It was also labelled as antisemitic by some authors.

In the 2010s LPR ceased to arouse controversy and began gradually moving to the centre. The party is no longer nationalist and Eurosceptic. Its views on religion have also become more moderate.

Stance towards the European Union 
The party was anti-EU. The Economist reported in 2002 that the LPR spreads the word that the EU is a communist conspiracy. Although it was the only significant political force in Poland that unconditionally opposed Polish membership in the European Union (believing that a union controlled by social liberals could never be reformed), after Polish accession to the EU the party participated in European Parliament elections, in order to have actual influence over decisions made regarding Poland. During the 2004 controversy surrounding Rocco Buttiglione (the conservative Italian nominee as European Commissioner for "Justice, Freedom, and Security"), the LPR deputies demanded the dissolution of the parliament, feeling that it was too much under the influence of a homosexual lobby. . In 2004, 31 MEPs from the UK, Poland, Denmark and Sweden formed the new Independence/Democracy, formerly the group for Europe of Democracies and Diversities. The main goals of this group were the rejection of any European Constitution and opposition to any plans for a federal Europe. Currently, LPR is pro-European and considers membership in the European Union as the will of the Polish nation. However, it has in recent years softened its stance towards the European Union. Although it retains its nationalistic ideology, it mainly tolerates the EU, changing from Hard Eurosceptic to soft Europsceptic.

Election results

Sejm

Senate

European Parliament

Regional assemblies

Literature 

 The League of Polish Families between East and West, past and present by Sarah L. de Lange and Simona Guerrab. In: Communist and Post-Communist Studies. Volume 42, Issue 4, December 2009, pp. 527–549

See also 

 List of League of Polish Families politicians
 Radio Maryja
 League and Self-Defense
 League of the Right of the Republic
 National Movement

References

External links

 

2001 establishments in Poland
Antisemitism in Europe
Antisemitism in Poland
Catholic political parties
Christian democratic parties in Europe
Conservative parties in Poland
Far-right political parties in Poland
Libertas.eu
National Democracy
Nationalist parties in Poland
Political parties established in 2001
Political parties in Poland
Social conservative parties
Pro-European political parties in Poland